Miguel Hurtado (born 22 April 1978 in Málaga, Spain) is a Spanish astronomer and a software developer at OAM's La Sagra Observatory, where he participated in the discovery of minor planets, comets, and supernovae.

Miguel Hurtado has listed the discovery of more than 2300 asteroids including 76 near-earth objects such as 2012 DA14, as well as 5 comets and 19 supernovae. As of 2017, all numbered asteroids are credited by the Minor Planet Center to Mallorca Observatory, OAM. Jaime Nomen, his college and collaborator at the La Sagra Sky Survey (LSSS), was awarded the Shoemaker NEO Grant in 2010.

The main-belt asteroid 362911 Miguelhurtado, discovered at OAM–La Sagra Observatory in 2009, was named in his honor.

Discoveries

Near-Earth asteroids

Comets 

 P/2012 R2 (La Sagra)
 C/2012 B3 (La Sagra)
 P/2012 NJ (La Sagra)
 P/2012 S2 (La Sagra)
 C/2013 H1 (La Sagra)

Supernovae 

 SN 2010ax
 SN 2010dt
 SN 2010gq
 SN 2010eu
 SN 2010gj
 SN 2010gs
 SN 2010hn
 SN 2010ij
 SN 2010ix
 SN 2010jf
 SN 2010jm
 SN 2010lo
 SN 2011ak
 SN 2011bm
 SN 2011bk
 SN 2011dz
 SN 2013ci
 SN 2013dv
 SN 2013dw

See also

References

External links 
 Miguel Hurtado Personal webpage
 La Sagra Sky Survey, Official Webpage 
 La Sagra Sky Survey at minorplanets.org
  (Miguel Hurtado)

1978 births
20th-century Spanish astronomers
21st-century Spanish astronomers
Living people